The Junior women's race at the 1994 IAAF World Cross Country Championships was held in Budapest, Hungary, at the Kincsem Park on March 26, 1994.     A preview on the event was given in the Herald, and a report in The New York Times.

Complete results, medallists, 
 and the results of British athletes were published.

Race results

Junior women's race (4.3 km)

Individual

Teams

Note: Athletes in parentheses did not score for the team result

Participation
An unofficial count yields the participation of 142 athletes from 39 countries in the Junior women's race.  This is in agreement with the official numbers as published.

 (4)
 (4)
 (4)
 (4)
 (4)
 (5)
 (4)
 (5)
 (6)
 (6)
 (5)
 (1)
 (6)
 (4)
 (6)
 (6)
 (2)
 (6)
 (1)
 (1)
 (1)
 (1)
 (5)
 (1)
 (6)
 (6)
 (1)
 (2)
 (1)
 (6)
 (6)
 (1)
 (1)
 (1)
 (4)
 (6)
 (6)
 (1)
 (2)

See also
 1994 IAAF World Cross Country Championships – Senior men's race
 1994 IAAF World Cross Country Championships – Junior men's race
 1994 IAAF World Cross Country Championships – Senior women's race

References

Junior women's race at the World Athletics Cross Country Championships
IAAF World Cross Country Championships
1994 in women's athletics
1994 in youth sport